Crosby & Nash Highlights is a shortened version of 2004's Crosby & Nash.

Track listing
"Lay Me Down" (James Raymond) – 3:37
"Milky Way Tonight" (Graham Nash) – 3:25
"Don't Dig Here" (Raymond, Nash, Kunkel) – 6:10
"Penguin in a Palm Tree" (Nash) – 3:50
"I Surrender" (Cohn) – 4:15
"Through Here Quite Often" (David Crosby, Dean Parks) – 4:05
"They Want It All" (Crosby) – 5:35
"Puppeteer" (Raymond) – 4:06
"Live on (the Wall)" (Flannery, Nash, Plunkett, Proffer) – 3:22
"Grace" (Raymond) – 0:46
"Jesus of Rio" (Nash, Jeff Pevar) – 4:12
"How Does It Shine?" (Crosby) – 5:21
"My Country 'Tis of Thee" (Traditional) – 1:43

Personnel
 David Crosby - vocals, guitar
 Graham Nash - vocals, guitar, harmonica, piano
 Dean Parks - guitar
 Jeff Pevar - guitar
 Dan Dugmore - pedal steel guitar
 Steve Farris - electric guitar
 Leland Sklar - bass
 James Raymond - keyboards
 Matt Rollings - piano
 Russ Kunkel - drums, percussion
 Luis Conte - percussion
 Arnold McCuller - vocals
 Kate Markowitz - vocals
 Windy Wagner - vocals

External links
 Crosby & Nash

2006 albums
Albums produced by Stephen Barncard
Sanctuary Records albums
Crosby & Nash compilation albums